Michel Bergeron (born June 12, 1946) is a Canadian former ice hockey coach.

Coaching career
Bergeron began his coaching career behind the bench of a midget team from Rosemont, Quebec. During his second season, he led the team to a national championship. He then took over for the Trois-Rivieres Draveurs of the QMJHL, leading the team to two Memorial Cup appearances.

In 1980, Bergeron became an assistant coach for the Quebec Nordiques. Six games into the season, with the Nordiques sputtering to a 1-3-2 start, general manager and head coach Maurice Filion dropped his head coach's title and named Bergeron his successor. Bergeron remained head coach until 1987. His teams gained a reputation for playing a high scoring, quick paced game. As coach, Bergeron also devoted significant time to pursuing European players, adding the Stastny brothers after their defection from Czechoslovakia. His teams reached the postseason in each of seven years behind the Quebec bench, including two trips to the Wales Conference Finals.

Just before the 1987 draft, Bergeron was traded to the New York Rangers for a first-round draft pick and $75,000, which was a first in NHL history. In spite of on-ice achievements, Bergeron's relationship with the Nordiques  front office had become rather strained in recent years. Nonetheless, his reputation as a strong motivator enticed the Rangers, who were seeking coaching stability. Bergeron was the franchise's 13th head coach in 12 years.

Bergeron's first season in New York saw the Rangers in a battle with the upstart New Jersey Devils for the final playoff spot in the Patrick Division. A tie with the Winnipeg Jets in the second-to-last game of the season  left the Rangers and Devils tied with 80 points each. However, the Devils had one more win, meaning that if both teams won their final game, the Devils would advance on the tiebreaker. On the final day of the season, the Rangers easily defeated Bergeron's old team, the Nordiques, 3–0. Hours later, the Devils defeated the Chicago Blackhawks in overtime, 4–3. The Devils went to the playoffs, and the Rangers went home. Had the Rangers defeated the Jets rather than tie them, they would have sealed the last playoff spot in the Patrick Division with their win over the Nordiques.

With two games remaining in the 1988–89 NHL season, general manager Phil Esposito fired Bergeron and named himself head coach for the remainder of the season. Even though the Rangers had secured a playoff spot, Bergeron had drawn the ire of Esposito by vocally requesting a contract extension; Esposito stating that the firing was rooted in "philosophical differences."

Bergeron returned to Quebec during the 1989–90 NHL season, presiding over a ghastly 12-win season that is still the worst in Nordiques/Avalanche franchise history (both NHL and WHA). He was fired after the season. His 265 wins over two stints are still the most in franchise history. Due in part to the 1989-90 debacle, he also owns the most career losses in franchise history.

In December 1990, he was treated for a mild heart attack.

Legacy
Bergeron earned the nicknames of "Le Tigre" ("The Tiger") and "Napoleon", in reference to his fiery temper, small stature, and French lineage. Bergeron reportedly even got under the nerves of Cuban leader Fidel Castro; in 1964, Bergeron was the catcher on a travelling Canadian baseball team, and, despite the tradition of visiting teams showing deference to the Cuban executive during his appearances in games, Bergeron cut down Castro as he attempted to score.

Broadcasting career
Bergeron served as panelist on the popular French talkshow "l'antichambre" which is broadcast on RDS. He spent 6 years with RDS and he was nicknamed "le capitaine" on the talkshow. Bergeron quit RDS for TVA Sports on December 19, 2013. He is a panelist before and during games when TVA broadcasts NHL hockey. TVA Sports recently acquired the rights to broadcast 20 regular season Montreal Canadiens games in French.

In 2021 he was a competitor on Chanteurs masqués, the Quebec adaptation of the Masked Singer franchise. He sang Frank Sinatra's "New York, New York" in costume as a whitecoat seal, but was the first person eliminated from the competition.

Coaching record

NHL

QMJHL

References

External links
Coaching statistics

1946 births
Living people
French Quebecers
Ice hockey people from Montreal
Montreal Canadiens announcers
National Hockey League broadcasters
New York Rangers coaches
Quebec Nordiques coaches
Trois-Rivières Draveurs coaches